U-82 may refer to one of the following German submarines:

 , a Type U 81 submarine launched in 1916 and that served in the First World War until surrendered on 16 January 1919; broken up at Blyth in 1922
 During the First World War, Germany also had this submarine with a similar name:
 , a Type UB III submarine launched in 1917 and sunk on 17 April 1918
 , a Type VIIC submarine that served in the Second World War until sunk on 6 February 1942

Submarines of Germany